San Marco dei Cavoti is a comune (municipality) in the Province of Benevento in the Italian region Campania, located near the Fortore River valley.

San Marco is one of the best-known places in Italy for the production of torrone. There are around 10 companies in the production of this product,  mainly family owned.

In the past the internal economy was dominated by textile productions, but later the production fell along with the Italian trends.

Main sights
Torre Provenzale ("Provençal Tower"), a 14th-century jail later turned into a bell tower.
Church of Maria SS.del Carmine  (14th century), remade and provided with new frescoes in the 18th century.
Rural church of ''Santa Barbara' (16th century)
Palace Jelardi (18th century)

References

Cities and towns in Campania